Pedro Waldemar Manfredini (7 September 1935 – 21 January 2019) was an Argentine professional footballer who played as a striker.

Club career
Manfredini began his career with Argentine club Racing Club de Avellaneda in 1957, winning the 1958 Argentine Primera División, and finishing the season as the joint-fourth highest goalscorer, and as his club's top scorer, with 19 goals.

After two seasons in Argentina, he subsequently moved to Italian Serie A side A.S. Roma in 1959, where he played for seven seasons. He won the Inter-Cities Fairs Cup with the club in 1961 (the predecessor to the UEFA Cup), finishing as the top scorer of the tournament, with 12 goals.

During the 1962–63 season, he was the Serie A top scorer (tied with Harald Nielsen with 19 goals), and he once again finished as the top scorer of the 1962–63 Inter-Cities Fairs Cup, scoring 6 goals throughout the tournament, as Roma reached the semi-finals, losing out to the eventual champions Valencia. He also won the Coppa Italia with Roma during the 1963–64 season, finishing the tournament as top scorer yet again, with 4 goals. In total, he played 130 games for A.S. Roma and scored 76 times.

He later spent a season with Brescia and then Venezia before retiring.

International career
Manfredini was capped three times for Argentina, scoring two goals. He took part in the first ever edition of the Copa América in 1959, on home soil, making his debut in the competition, and appearing three times. He scored two goals in a 6–1 win against Chile in the opening match of the tournament, which was also his international debut, helping his country to lift the South American Championship title.

Honours

Club
Racing Club
Primera División: 1958

Roma
Coppa Italia: 1963–64
Inter-Cities Fairs Cup: 1960–61

International
Argentina
Copa América: 1959

Individual
Serie A top goal-scorer: 1962–63
Coppa Italia top goal-scorer: 1963–64
Inter-Cities Fairs Cup top goal-scorer: 1960–61, 1962–63

References

External links

BDFA profile 

1935 births
2019 deaths
People from Maipú, Argentina
Association football forwards
Argentine people of Italian descent
Argentine footballers
Argentine expatriate footballers
Argentina international footballers
Racing Club de Avellaneda footballers
A.S. Roma players
Brescia Calcio players
Venezia F.C. players
Deportes La Serena footballers
Chilean Primera División players
Serie A players
Serie B players
Expatriate footballers in Chile
Expatriate footballers in Italy
Argentine expatriate sportspeople in Italy
Copa América-winning players
Sportspeople from Mendoza Province